"Make America Great Again" or MAGA is an American political slogan which was popularized by Donald Trump during his successful 2016 presidential campaign. The slogan became a pop culture phenomenon, seeing widespread use and spawning numerous variants in the arts, entertainment and politics, being used by those who support and oppose the presidency of Donald Trump.

Since its popularization in the 2010s, the slogan has been accused by some of being a loaded phrase. Multiple journalists, scholars, and commentators have called the slogan racist, regarding it as dog-whistle politics and coded language. Some have rejected the racist characterization, saying that the slogan is instead patriotic or American nationalist.

Use of the phrase before Donald Trump 
While it is not necessarily invoked as a formal slogan, the phrase has been used in politics and literature on numerous occasions.

Alexander Wiley 
Republican senator Alexander Wiley employed the phrase in a speech at the third session of the 76th Congress ahead of the 1940 presidential election: "America needs a leader who can coordinate labor, capital, and management; who can give the man of enterprise encouragement, who can give them the spirit which will beget vision. That will make America great again."

Barry Goldwater 

The slogan was found in some advertising associated with Barry Goldwater's unsuccessful 1964 presidential campaign.

Ronald Reagan 

"Let's make America great again" was famously used in Ronald Reagan's 1980 presidential campaign. At the time the United States was suffering from a worsening economy at home marked by stagflation. Using the country's economic distress as a springboard for his campaign, Reagan used the slogan to stir a sense of patriotism among the electorate. Within his acceptance speech at the 1980 Republican National Convention, Reagan said, "For those without job opportunities, we'll stimulate new opportunities, particularly in the inner cities where they live. For those who've abandoned hope, we'll restore hope and we'll welcome them into a great national crusade to make America great again."

Bill Clinton 

The phrase was also used in speeches by Bill Clinton during his 1992 presidential campaign. Clinton also used the phrase in a radio commercial aired for Hillary Clinton's 2008 presidential primary campaign.

During the 2016 electoral campaign, Clinton suggested that Trump's version, used as a campaign rallying cry, was a message to white Southerners that Trump was promising to "give you an economy you had 50 years ago, and... move you back up on the social totem pole and other people down."

In fiction 
Author Octavia E. Butler used "Make America Great Again" as the presidential campaign slogan for a character, Andrew Steele Jarret, in her 1998 dystopian novel, Parable of the Talents.

Christine O'Donnell 
Christine O'Donnell's book about her unsuccessful 2010 bid as the Republican nominee for a US Senate seat in Delaware was published by St. Martin's Press on August 16, 2011, as Troublemaker: Let's Do What It Takes to Make America Great Again.

Use by Donald Trump

In December 2011, Trump made a statement in which he said he was unwilling to rule out running as a presidential candidate in the future, explaining "I must leave all of my options open because, above all else, we must make America great again." Also in December 2011, he published a book using as a subtitle the similar phrase "Making America #1 Again"which in a 2015 reissue was changed to "Make America Great Again!"

On January 1, 2012, a group of Trump supporters filed paperwork with the Texas Secretary of State's office to create the "Make America Great Again Party", which would have allowed Trump to be that party's nominee if he had decided to become a third-party candidate in the 2012 presidential election. Trump himself began using the slogan formally on November 7, 2012, the day after Barack Obama won his reelection against Mitt Romney. By his own account, Trump first considered "We Will Make America Great", but did not feel like it had the right "ring" to it. "Make America Great" was his next slogan idea, but upon further reflection, he felt that it was a slight to America because it implied that America was never great. After selecting "Make America Great Again", Trump immediately had an attorney register it. (Trump later said he was unaware of Reagan's use in 1980 until 2015, but noted that "he didn't trademark it.") On November 12 he signed an application with the United States Patent and Trademark Office requesting exclusive rights to use the slogan for political purposes. It was registered as a service mark on July 14, 2015, after Trump formally began his 2016 presidential campaign and demonstrated that he was using the slogan for the purpose stated on the application. Trump used the slogan in public as early as August 2013, in an interview with Jonathan Karl.

During the 2016 campaign, Trump often used the slogan, especially by wearing hats emblazoned with the phrase in white letters, which soon became popular among his supporters. The slogan was so important to the campaign that at one point it spent more on making the hatssold for $25 each on its websitethan on polling, consultants, or television commercials. Millions were sold, and Trump estimated that counterfeit versions outnumbered the real hat ten to one. "...but it was a slogan, and every time somebody buys one, that's an advertisement."

Following Trump's election, the website of his presidential transition was established at greatagain.gov. Trump said in 2017 and 2018 that the slogan of his 2020 reelection campaign would be "Keep America Great" and he sought to trademark it. However, Trump's 2020 campaign continued to use the "Make America Great Again" slogan. Trump's vice president, Mike Pence, used the phrase "make America great again, again" in his 2020 Republican National Convention speech, garnering ridicule and comparisons to the catchphrase "again-again" from Teletubbies. In late 2021, this phrase became the name of a pro-Trump Super-PAC, which was also mocked.

A 2020 executive order, titled "Promoting Beautiful Federal Civic Architecture," was nicknamed "Make Federal Buildings Beautiful Again" by proponents and the press.

Less than a week after Trump left office, he spoke to advisors about possibly establishing a third party, which he suggested might be named either the "Patriot Party" or "Make America Great Again Party". In his first few days out of office, he also supported Arizona state party chairwoman Kelli Ward, who likewise called for the creation of a "MAGA Party". In late January 2021, the former president viewed the proposed MAGA Party as leverage to prevent Republican senators from voting to convict him during the Senate impeachment trial, and to field challengers to Republicans who voted for his impeachment in the House.

The phrase is being used again as the official slogan of Trump's 2024 presidential campaign.

Use on social media sites

Donald Trump took the campaign slogan to social media (primarily to Twitter), using the hashtags #makeamericagreatagain and its acronym #maga. In response to criticism regarding his frequent and untraditional usage of social media, Trump defended himself by tweeting "My use of social media is not Presidentialit's MODERN DAY PRESIDENTIAL. Make America Great Again!" on July 1, 2017.

In the first half of 2017, Trump posted his slogan on Twitter 33 times. In an article for Bloomberg News, Mark Whitehouse noted "A regression analysis suggests the phrase adds (very roughly) 51,000 to a post's retweet-and-favorite count, which is important given that the average Trump tweet attracts a total of 107,000."

Trump attributed his victory (in part) to social media when he said "I won the 2016 election with interviews, speeches, and social media." According to RiteTag, the estimated hourly statistics for #maga on Twitter alone include: 1,304 unique tweets, 5,820,000 hashtag exposure, and 3,424 retweets with 14% of #maga tweets including images, 55% including links, and 51% including mentions.

Donald Trump set up his Twitter account in March 2009. His follower-count increased significantly following the announcement (June 16, 2015) of his intention to run for president in the 2016 presidential election, with particularly notable spikes occurring after his securing the Republican Party nomination (May 3, 2016) and after winning the presidency.

Accusations of racism

Regarding the use of it since 2015, the phrase "Make America Great Again" is considered a loaded phrase. Marissa Melton, a Voice of America journalist, among others, explained how it is a loaded phrase because it "doesn't just appeal to people who hear it as racist coded language, but also to those who have felt a loss of status as other groups have become more empowered." As Sarah Churchwell explains, the slogan now resonates as America First did in the early 1940s, with the idea "that the true version of America is the America that looks like me, the American fantasy I imagine existed before it was diluted with other races and other people."

Writing opinion for the Los Angeles Times, Robin Abcarian wrote that "[w]earing a 'Make America Great Again' hat is not necessarily an overt expression of racism. But if you wear one, it's a pretty good indication that you share, admire or appreciate President Trump's racist views about Mexicans, Muslims and border walls." The Detroit Free Press and the Los Angeles Times reported how several of their readers rejected this characterization and did not believe the slogan or MAGA hats are evidence of racism, seeing them more in patriotic or American nationalist terms. Nicholas Goldberg described the slogan as "fabulous", writing: "It was vague enough to appeal to optimists generally, while leaving plenty of room for bitter and resentful voters to conclude that we were finally going back to the days when they ran the world." Polling has shown that about ten percent of black voters identified as Trump supporters, while about thirty percent of Hispanic voters identified as Trump supporters.

A 2018 study which used text mining and semantic network analytics of Twitter text and hashtags networks found that the "#MakeAmericaGreatAgain" and "#MAGA" hashtags were commonly used by white supremacist and white nationalist users, and had been used as "an organizing discursive space" for far-right extremists globally.

Derivative slogans 
"Make America Great Again" has been the subject of many parodies, jokes, instances of praise, references, and criticisms which base themselves on the four word slogan.

Derivatives used by Trump 
"Keep America Great" has been the most popular derivative of "Make America Great Again", with Trump's 2020 presidential campaign adopting it as the official slogan, though often used alongside "Make America Great Again".

Upon Trump announcing his candidacy for president in the 2024 election, commentators described his use of the tagline "Make America Great and Glorious Again" ("MAGAGA"). The term has come to be a humorous descriptor for Trump's re-election bid, and many outlets have commented on the humor that "MAGAGA" provides, usually on the word "gag" being part of the acronym.

Anti-Trump derivatives 
After Donald Trump popularized the use of the phrase, the phrase and modifications of it were widely used in reference both to his election campaign and to his politics. Trump's primary opponents, Ted Cruz and Scott Walker, began using "Make America Great Again" in speeches, inciting Trump to send cease-and-desist letters to them. Cruz later sold hats featuring, "Make Trump Debate Again", in response to Trump's boycotting the Iowa January 28, 2016, debate. The phrase has also been parodied in political statements, such as "Make America Mexico Again", a critique of Trump's immigration policies regarding the US–Mexico border.

Adult film star Stormy Daniels, who allegedly had an affair with President Trump, took part in a "Make America Horny Again" strip club tour. The tour followed Trump's initial 2016 campaign trail and part of the revenue was donated to Planned Parenthood.

John Oliver spoofed the slogan on his show Last Week Tonight with John Oliver in a segment dedicated to Trump, urging viewers to "Make Donald Drumpf Again", in reference to the original ancestral name of the Trump family. The segment broke HBO viewership records, garnering 85 million views.

One of the most widespread anti-Trump derivatives of "Make America Great Again" during the Trump presidency and the 2020 election was "Make America Think Again", often combined with 2020 Democratic primary candidate Andrew Yang's preferred version of "Make America Think Harder" ("MATH"). The slogan has been spotted at numerous anti-Trump events from Democratic political rallies to marches to social media, with Live Science noting "Think Again" as one of its top hashtags for 2017.

Climate change 
In June 2017, French President Emmanuel Macron rebuked Trump over withdrawing from the Paris Agreement. The last sentence of the speech delivered by him was "make our planet great again." Members of the Fridays for Future Movement have also frequently used slogans like "Make Earth Greta Again", referring to activist Greta Thunberg. In 2019, Grant Armour and Milene Larsson co-directed a documentary film named Make the World Greta Again.

"Make America White Again" 
"Make America White Again" has semi-frequently been used by hate groups which politically align themselves with Trump.  Australian political commentator and former Liberal party leader John Hewson also used the slogan in reference to his belief that recent global movements against traditional politics and politicians are based on racism and prejudice. He comments: "There should be little doubt about US President Donald Trump's views on race, despite his occasional 'denials', assertions of 'fake news', and/or his semantic distinctions. His election campaign theme was effectively a promise to 'Make America Great Again; America First and Only' and—nod, nod, wink, wink—to Make America White Again."

In popular culture 
"Make America Great Again" has frequently been parodied in advertising, the media, and other outlets of popular culture, with varying levels of comparison to Trump from none at all to a rebuke of the former president and his ideology. In advertising, the slogan was parodied by Dunk-a-roos as "Make America Dunk Again",  the video game Wolfenstein: The New Colossus as "Make America Nazi-Free Again", the film Sharknado 5: Global Swarming with "Make America Bait Again", Snoop Dogg with the song "Make America Crip Again", Star Trek: Discovery episode "What's Past Is Prologue" with Gabriel Lorca vowing in one scene to "make the Empire glorious again".

References to the slogan by others

In politics 
Political commentator and author Peter Beinart published a 2006 book titled The Good Fight: Why Liberalsand Only LiberalsCan Win the War on Terror and Make America Great Again drawing on the philosophy of theologian Reinhold Niebuhr after the Invasion of Iraq and during the early years of the War on Terror. In 2011, Christine O'Donnell published a book about her Republican Senate campaign in the 2010 Delaware special election titled Troublemaker: Let's Do What It Takes To Make America Great Again.

During remarks at the White House on May 4, 2022, President Biden referred to former President Trump’s "Make America Great Again" movement, saying, "This MAGA crowd is really the most extreme political organization that's existed in American history, in recent American history." On September 1, 2022, he dedicated remarks at the White House "on the continued battle for the soul of the nation" to attacks on "Donald Trump and the MAGA Republicans", saying that "Donald Trump and the MAGA Republicans represent an extremism that threatens the very foundations of our republic." and that "MAGA Republicans have made their choice. They embrace anger. They thrive on chaos. They live not in the light of truth but in the shadow of lies".

Use of the slogan by political rivals 
New York Governor Andrew Cuomo said America "was never that great" during a September 2018 bill signing. Former US Attorney General Eric Holder questioned the slogan in a March 2019 interview on MSNBC, asking: "Exactly when did you think America was great?" During John McCain's memorial service on September 1, 2018, his daughter Meghan stated: "The America of John McCain has no need to be made great again because America was always great." Trump subsequently tweeted "MAKE AMERICA GREAT AGAIN!" later that day.

In other countries 
During his campaign for the 2019 Indonesian presidential election in October 2018, former opposition leader Prabowo Subianto used the phrase "make Indonesia great again", though he denied having copied Trump.

During the Swedish European Parliament election in May 2019, the Swedish Christian Democratic Party used the slogan "Make EU Lagom Again".

The Spanish right party VOX used as slogan "Hacer a España grande otra vez", or "Make Spain Great Again".

In popular culture

The phrase and its variants are widely used in media.

In artwork 
Make Everything Great Again was a street art mural by artist Mindaugas Bonanu in Vilnius, Lithuania.

In fashion 
Fashion Designer Andre Soriano used the "Make America Great Again" Official presidential campaign Flag to design a MAGA Gown for celebrities in Hollywood to wear on Red Carpet e.g. 2017 Grammy Awards.

In films 
The tagline for The Purge: Election Year (2016) is "Keep America Great" (a phrase Trump would later use as his 2020 campaign slogan); one of the TV spots for the film featured Americans who explained why they support the Purge, with one stating he does so "to keep my country [America] great". The next film in the franchise, The First Purge, was subsequently advertised with a poster featuring its title stylized on a MAGA hat.

In music 
Singer Joy Villa produced a single "Make America Great Again" a few months after appearing at the 2017 Grammy Awards in a 'MAGA' dress.

On television 
In the South Park episode "Where My Country Gone?" (2015), supporters of Mr. Garrison, who runs a campaign that is a parody of Trump's, are seen holding signs bearing the slogan.

Notes

References

External links

 
 
 
 
 
 
Reagan at the 1980 GOP convention

1980 neologisms
1980 United States presidential election
American exceptionalism
American political catchphrases
Donald Trump 2016 presidential campaign
Donald Trump 2024 presidential campaign
Donald Trump and social media
Nostalgia in the United States
Conservatism in the United States
Trumpism